Glossopappus is a genus of flowering plants in the daisy family.

Species
There is only one known species, Glossopappus macrotus, native to the western Mediterranean (Algeria, Morocco, Tunisia, Spain, Portugal)

References

External links
Flora Vascular
Flora-on

Monotypic Asteraceae genera
Anthemideae